The Sao Khua sclerorhynchoid is an unnamed genus and species of sclerorhynchoid from the Early Cretaceous Sao Khua Formation in Thailand. It is known from the tip of a rostral denticle that is deposited in the Sirindhorn Museum as SM 2012-1-021. The denticle has a single barb similar to Onchopristis, Onchosaurus, and Pucapristis, but is distinguished from all other genera by having a row of enameloid "droplets" on each side. It is one of the earliest sclerorhynchoids, along with Celtipristis and Onchopristis which also appeared in the Barremian.

References

Rajiformes
Early Cretaceous fish of Asia
Undescribed vertebrate species